Constantin Ferariu (born 23 September 1986) is a Romanian footballer who plays as a defender for CSM Pașcani.

External links

1986 births
Living people
Romanian footballers
CSM Ceahlăul Piatra Neamț players
ACS Foresta Suceava players
Liga I players
Liga II players
Association football defenders